Papyrus 97 (in the Gregory-Aland numbering), designated by 𝔓97, is a copy of the New Testament in Greek. It is a papyrus manuscript of the Gospel of Luke. The manuscript has survived in a fragmentary condition.

Description 

The surviving texts of Luke are only verses 14:7-14. The manuscript palaeographically has been assigned to the 6th century (or 7th century).

 Text
The Greek text of this manuscript is a representative of the Alexandrian text-type. It is not placed in any of Aland's Categories.

 Location
The manuscript is currently housed at the Chester Beatty Library (P. Chester Beatty XVII) at Dublin.

See also 

 List of New Testament papyri
 Luke 14
 Coptic versions of the Bible

References

External links 
 GA Papyrus 97. Center for the Study of New Testament Manuscripts

New Testament papyri
6th-century biblical manuscripts
Manuscripts in the Chester Beatty Library
Gospel of Luke papyri